The Lincoln Blue Tigers football program represents Lincoln University in college football and competes in the Division II level of the National Collegiate Athletics Association (NCAA). In 2014, Lincoln became an affiliate member of the Great Lakes Valley Conference, returning to Mid-America Intercollegiate Athletics Association in 2019. Lincoln competed in the Mid-America Intercollegiate Athletics Association from 1970 to 1989 and 2011 to 2013, while primarily remaining as member of that conference. LU's home games are played at Dwight T. Reed Stadium in Jefferson City, Missouri. The programs maintains an all time record of 248–453–25.

Conference affiliations
 1920–1969: Independent
 1970–1989: Missouri Intercollegiate Athletic Association
 1990–1999: No team
 2000: Central States Football League
 2001–2006: NCAA Division II Independent
 2007–2009: Great Lakes Football Conference
 2010: NCAA Division II Independent
 2011–2013: Mid-America Intercollegiate Athletics Association
 2014–2018: Great Lakes Valley Conference
 2019–present: Mid-America Intercollegiate Athletics Association

Stadium
The Blue Tigers have played their home games at Dwight T. Reed Stadium since 1971. Reed Stadium was named for a Dwight T. Reed, their most successful football coach. The current capacity of the stadium is at 3,000 but the university lists it at 5,500

Championships

Conference championship seasons

Postseason appearances

References

External links
 

 
American football teams established in 1920
1920 establishments in Missouri